Victoria Balomenos (born 14 February 1988 in Ashford, South Australia) is an Australian soccer player who played for Australian W-League teams Adelaide United and Sydney FC. Balomenos played nine times for the Australia women's national soccer team.

Club career

Adelaide United
Balomenos sat out the second season of the W-League due to a knee re-construction. She re-signed with Adelaide United the following season, and on 7 November 2010 she returned to W-League football against Newcastle Jets.

International career
Balomenos played nine matches for the Australian national team, the Matildas, in 2007 and 2008.

Honours

International
Australia
 AFF Women's Championship: 2008

References

See also 
 List of Australia women's international soccer players

Adelaide United FC (A-League Women) players
Sydney FC (A-League Women) players
Australian women's soccer players
Living people
1988 births
Women's association football forwards